"Ashes to Ashes" is an episode of the BBC sitcom, Only Fools and Horses. It was the second episode of Series 2, and was first screened on 28 October 1982.

Synopsis
As Del Boy and Rodney are in the market conducting business, Trigger arrives and asks them if they will attend the funeral of his grandmother Alice. At first hesitant, they learn that they will be the only other mourners, so the Trotters agree.

Later, after the funeral, Del, Rodney, Trigger, and Grandad go to Alice's house, and Trigger tells the Trotters that his father died a couple of years before he was born, as well as the story of how Alice had an affair with someone else while her husband Arthur was away fighting in the war. Among the many things in the house are two urns that Del can sell.

That night, back at the flat, as Del comes to the conclusion that the urns are valuable, Grandad looks in one of the urns and is shocked to see the ashes of Trigger's grandfather Arthur. Then, Grandad clears his conscience as he tells his grandsons that he was the man whom Alice had the affair with while Arthur was away, because his wife had left him at the time. When Arthur found out, he told Grandad that he would come back and haunt him someday. Del and Rodney, who do not believe in ghosts, reassure Grandad that the spirit will not haunt him and go to bed.

Later that night, at 3:00am, Del comes out of the bathroom, just to eavesdrop in on Grandad talking to the urn with Arthur's ashes in it. Del decides to mock him by talking through a traffic cone, making Grandad think that Arthur's ghost is speaking to him. Rodney is awakened by the voice and scares Del from behind. Grandad finally has enough and demands that Del and Rodney get the ashes out of the flat. Del explains that he cannot contact Trigger since he is on holiday in Ireland. Grandad suggests scattering Arthur's ashes at his old bowling club, the Peckham Bowling Green, the following night.

The next night, at the bowling club, Del and Rodney decide to scatter the ashes evenly while saying a prayer, but unfortunately, they cannot do so as the clubhouse lights up and the players arrive. The Trotter brothers quickly escape into the night.

The next morning, Del and Rodney try to pour Arthur's ashes into the water at St Katharine Docks, but are prevented from doing so by a river policeman.

After failing to pour the ashes into a cement mixer, the Trotters get lucky when a council cleaning lorry sucks up the ashes from the urn. Del reasons that it is fitting since Arthur used to be a road sweeper, but Rodney is uncomfortable with the solution.

When they return home, Grandad tells Del and Rodney that Trigger received their telephone calls, since he is fogbound at Gatwick Airport. Trigger tells Del something that Grandad forgot to mention: Trigger's grandmother Alice had been married twice. Del then shows Grandad the other urn which also contains ashes.

Episode cast

Notes 

 The episode title was based on the Christian funeral service phrase "ashes to ashes, dust to dust".

External links

1982 British television episodes
Only Fools and Horses (series 2) episodes
Television episodes about funerals